McRorie is a surname. It is derived from the Scottish Gaelic surname Mac Ruaidhrí.

People with the surname
Danny McRorie (1906–1963), Scottish footballer
Gordon McRorie (born 1988), Canadian rugby union player
Sally McRorie, American psychologist and painter

See also
Carolyn Darbyshire-McRorie (born 1963), Canadian curler

Citations

References

Anglicised Scottish Gaelic-language surnames
Patronymic surnames